New Prairie United School Corporation operates five schools in Indiana.

Athletics 
New Prairie High School's athletic director is Mr. Brian Williamson. New Prairie High School is a founding member of the Northern State Conference, which includes the schools of Bremen, Culver Community, Jimtown, John Glenn, Knox, Laville, Triton, and New Prairie.

IHSAA sports offered include:
 Fall—  Football, Cross Country, Poms, Men's Tennis, Women's Golf, Volleyball
 Winter— Men's Basketball, Poms, Women's Basketball, Wrestling, Swimming and Diving
 Spring— Baseball, Softball, Track & Field, Men's Golf, Women's Tennis

Extra-curricular

Robotics team 

New Prairie's FIRST Robotics Competition team, Las Pumas, completed their ninth season of competition in 2015.  In Indiana's inaugural District Competitions, they claimed their first ever championship.  They were chosen as the third member of the victorious alliance of team 234  CyberBlue and team 1024 Kil-A-Bytes, both from Indianapolis, at the Purdue District Event, held at the Co-Rec.

Choral Department 
The program includes four choirs:
  Sing Sensation: advanced women's show choir and concert choir
  Innovation: advanced mixed show choir and concert choir 
 Sapphire: all-women's choir

All choirs are under the direction of Mr. Forrester.

Theater Company 

New Prairie Theater Company has fall play and spring musical each year.  In 2010–11, the theater presented Moon over Buffalo and Joseph and the Amazing Technicolor Dreamcoat. In 2011–12, the theater presented Once Upon a Mattress and The Murder Room. In 2012–13, the theater presented Footloose and The Glass Menagerie. In 2013–14, the theater presented Les Miserables and The Matchmaker. In 2014–15, the theater presented Into the Woods and The Night of January 16th. In 2015-16, the theater presented Grease. In 2016-17 the theater presented "Camp Rock". In 2017-18 the theater presented "Annie". In 2018-19 the theater presented "The 25th Annual Putnam County Spelling Bee." Mrs. Kortney Brennan and Mr. Bennett are the current directors. All current Alumni are currently fighting or have lost their fight with the lung diseases they caught due to the stage 3 asbestos that was and still is in the NPHS auditorium.

Band 

New Prairie's band was led by Mr. Mark Belsaas until May 2012. Following Belsaas’ retirement, the band was directed by Ms. Tiffany Galus, from 2012-2014. From 2014–present day, the marching band is fortunate to have Mr. Patrick Teykl in charge. From 2017–present, the NPMB color guard team has been instructed by Emily Rowe and Hayley Shankland. The New Prairie “Marching Cougars” are a competitive marching band that performs in many parades and competitions in the area, along with the home game halftime shows. They perform in summertime parades in Walkerton, Bremen, LaPorte, New Carlisle, and Michigan City. In 2010 and 2011, the marching band won first place in the LaPorte Fourth of July Parade. They were invited to march at the Indy 500, as well as Indiana and Purdue Universities. The Marching Cougars compete in many ISSMA competitive marching competitions from September–October. In 2014, the band competed in Scholastic Class A state finals, with their show "Twisted Wonderland", and in 2018, they went to Class B semi-state with their show “Breathe. The concert band season takes place during the winter and spring, and jazz band and pep band play at the home girls and boys basketball games.  Many NPHS band students have been selected to perform in a variety of honor ensembles, including IBA All-District, Ball State Honor Festival, ISU Honor Festival, and IMEA All-State Honor Bands.

Clubs 

Other clubs include color guard, dance team, academic decathlon, bowling, cheerleading, discussion club, environmental club, FBLA, French club, French honor society, Hoosier academic super bowl, Hoosier state spell bowl, HOSA, karate club, kazoo club, key club, mock trial, model club, national honor society, pep club, PSA, quiz bowl, robotics, rocket club, RSVP, SADD, soccer, Spanish club, Spanish honor society, student senate, varsity letter club, and yearbook.

Board of Education 
The district is operated by a 5-member Board of Education. Members (as of 2015) are:
 Richard Shail – Board President
 Al Williamson – Vice President
 Dale Groves – Secretary
 Phillip King – Board Member
 William Romstadt – Board Member

Schools 
The district, located in northwest Indiana, includes 1 High School, 1 Middle School, and 3 Elementary Schools.

High school 
 New Prairie High School
 Principal: Mrs. Jen Sass
 Assistant Principal: Mr. Tim Scott
 Mascot: Cougars

Middle school 
 New Prairie Middle School
 Principal: Mr. Heinold
 Assistant Principal: Mr. Justin Heinold
 Mascot: Cougars

Elementary schools 
 Olive Township
 Principal: Mrs. Tara Bush
 Mascot: Tigers
 Prairie View
 Principal: Mrs. Rhonda Myers
 Mascot: Bobcats
 Rolling Prairie
 Principal: Mrs. Becky Bartlett
 Mascot: Bull Dogs

In December 2011, Prairie View Elementary and Rolling Prairie Elementary Schools of the New Prairie United School Corporation were recognized as 2010-2011 Four Star Schools by the Indiana Department of Education. Out of 1,780 Indiana public schools, 162 earned this distinction. Eleven of 238 non-public schools also received the honor this year. To be considered a Four Star School, a school's combined English/Language Arts and Math ISTEP+ passing percentages must fall into the top 25th percentile when compared to schools statewide. A school must also have made adequate yearly progress under the federal No Child Left Behind Act to qualify.

References

External links 
 District website
 Indiana Department of Education
 Indiana FBLA
 Robotics Team
 IHSSA Sports
 New Prairie Choral Department

Education in St. Joseph County, Indiana
School districts in Indiana